Jakarta Jakarta is a 1977 Indonesian drama film directed by Ami Prijono. The film won five awards at the Indonesian Film Festival in 1978.

Accolades

References 

Indonesian-language films
1977 films
1977 drama films
Indonesian drama films